A list of chapters of Alpha Sigma Alpha sorority. Active chapters and colonies noted in bold, inactive chapters and colonies noted in italics. Unless otherwise indicated, chapter information from Baird's Manual (several editions) or the national website.

Chapters
The first decade

|}
By 1912, all but four of these chapters had closed; most of Alpha Sigma Alpha's early chapters were placed at short-lived women's seminaries and the junior schools of the day. By the following year only Alpha chapter remained. Rising to meet what was an existential challenge Alpha Sigma Alpha reorganized itself at a crucial Fall 1914 convention to target growth into colleges with bona fide teachers programs, adding the practical aim of expansion by absorption of what was a series of local sororities. This strategy was successful. 

Over several decades, teachers colleges began to offer an expanded array of four-year degrees, while four-year schools were adding teachers programs. The AES was dissolved in 1947. By 1951 Alpha Sigma Alpha had once again shifted its focus, abandoning a self-imposed limit to serve only teachers colleges by opting to join the NPC as a full member and general sorority, and potentially serve all accredited colleges and universities. Today, including Alpha, 's list of chapters to emerge from that 1914 reorganization include:

Chapter activity since the 1914 reorganization

References

External links
Alpha Sigma Alpha Chapter Locator

Alpha Sigma Alpha
chapters